i105-107FM was a regional radio station in Ireland that broadcast to the north east and midlands of the country. The station was one of four regional youth orientated stations that were licensed by the Broadcasting Authority of Ireland to challenge the current monopoly in the 15 to 34 age bracket by national stations RTÉ 2fm and Today FM.

The station was based in Athlone and broadcast to Counties Carlow, Cavan, Kildare, (north) Laois, Louth, Meath, Monaghan,  Offaly and Westmeath between the frequencies of 104.7 MHz and 106.7 MHz, as well as offering an online stream.

The station's sister was i102-104, but in 2011, they merged to form iRadio

i105-107FM was launched in November 2008 and was owned by the iRadio consortium, who also hold the licence for the north west service through i102-104FM, which was launched in February 2008, and the two stations shared a number of programmes including the Tommy and Hector Show.

On the day Barack Obama was inaugurated (20 January 2009), the station changed its name to temporarily to 'Obama FM' in his honour for the day.

Programming

See also
 Radio in Ireland

References

Athlone
Contemporary hit radio stations in Ireland
Mass media in County Carlow
Mass media in County Cavan
Mass media in County Kildare
Mass media in County Laois
Mass media in County Louth
Mass media in County Meath
Mass media in County Monaghan
Mass media in County Westmeath
Defunct radio stations in the Republic of Ireland
Radio stations established in 2008
Radio stations disestablished in 2011